is a passenger railway station operated by the Takamatsu-Kotohira Electric Railroad in Takamatsu, Kagawa, Japan.  It is operated by the private transportation company Takamatsu-Kotohira Electric Railroad (Kotoden) and is designated station "K01".

Lines
Kataharamachi Station is the nominal terminal station of the Kotoden Kotohira Line, although all trains continue on to Takamatsu-Chikkō Station. It is located 32.9 km from the opposing terminus of the line at Kotoden-Kotohira Station. It is also used by trains of the  Nagao Line and is 14.6 kilometers from the terminus of that line at Nagao Station.

Layout
The station consists of two opposed side platforms connected by a level crossing. The station is staffed.

Adjacent stations

History
Kataharamachi Station opened on February 18, 1948 as a station of the Kotohira Electric Railway.

Surrounding area
Takamatsu Central Shopping Street
Kataharamachi Eastern Shopping Street
}Kataharamachi Seibu Shopping Street

Passenger statistics

See also
 List of railway stations in Japan

References

External links

  

Railway stations in Japan opened in 1948
Railway stations in Takamatsu